A White House conference is a national meeting sponsored by the Executive Office of the President of the United States with the purpose of discussing an issue or topic of importance to the American public.  Some last for one day while others last for several.  Typical attendees of a White House conference include experts in the particular field, community leaders and citizens with an interest in the issue.  The President usually speaks to a general session of the conference; the conference concludes by issuing a report to the President summarizing issues and making recommendations for executive or legislative action.  The First Lady of the United States also sometimes hosts White House conferences.  White House conferences are typically created by specific legislation.

The first White House conference was the Conference on the Care of Dependent Children held in 1909 under President Theodore Roosevelt; it later became the long-running White House Conference on Children and Youth.  The first iteration's recommendations called for the end of routine institutionalization of neglected or otherwise dependent children and the creation of the Federal Children's Bureau. The most well-known White House conference is the White House Conference on Aging, which has occurred once a decade since the 1950s.  Other well-known conferences include the 1966 White House Conference on Civil Rights and the 1971 White House Conference on Youth.  Other topics have included drug abuse, education, family life, nutrition, disabled people and other issues.

References

United States national commissions